El Cristo may refer to:
El Cristo, Chiriquí, Panama
El Cristo, Coclé, Panama
El Cristo (Santiago de Cuba), Cuba

See also
Cristo (disambiguation)